Klaipėda municipality can refer to either of these two municipalities in Lithuania:

 Klaipėda
 Klaipėda District Municipality